Journeys to The Under-World, also known as Voyages to Hell, is a Taiwanese novel describing what Yangsheng (楊生), a planchette handler, saw and heard when he followed his master Ji Gong to hell on the instruction of the Jade Emperor. The story is about the consequences resulting from actions during the life of a person. It contains journeys made by Ji Gong and Yangsheng to each level in hell to warn those in the living world with an evil heart. Each chapter contains detailed descriptions of their observations and interviews with souls being punished in hell.

Author
The author is a Taiwanese writer, Yang Zanru (born 1951), who refers to himself as "Yangsheng" in the book. He became a Buddhist monk in 1997 and adopted the Buddhist name "Shenglun".

Production
According to the author, the production of these accounts were painstakingly achieved by the use of fuji (planchette writing) with Ji Gong as the guide and Yangsheng as the medium. The details and conversations of each journey were written in Chinese characters on the planchette board during each fuji session, which was a very tedious and time-consuming process. The visits were generally made at night.
Collection of material for the book started in 1976 at Sheng-hsien Tang (聖賢堂) in Taichung, Taiwan. The project was completed and published in Chinese in 1978.

See also

 Jade Record
 Chinese spiritual world concepts
 Inferno (Dante)

Notes

References
 Voyages to Hell (1978). VoVi: Bangkok, Thailand. ASIN B000F3P88Q

External links
 Voyages to Hell
 The first sites of posting the English text online
  Journeys to the Under-World
 Comics

1976 novels
Bangsian fantasy
Taiwanese novels
Visionary fiction